Noris Joffre (born October 27, 1966) is a Puerto Rican actress and comedian. Born in Miami, Florida, the biological child of a Panamanian father, Carlos Guillermo Escalante, and an Irish mother, Kathleen Ryan Messier. She was given the name Theresa Ann Ryan by her biological mother and surrendered for adoption.

Her professional life has been centered in Puerto Rico, where she may be best known for her comedic depiction of former Governor Sila Calderón. She has worked on local TV stations as well as local theater. She is currently a co-host of a daily daytime show, Entre Nosotras on WAPA-TV. Joffre is married to actor José Brocco.

External links

"Noris Joffre llora por optar por Univision", metro.pr; accessed April 7, 2016. 
"Noris Joffre sin freno en el teatro y la televisión en Miami"; accessed April 7, 2016.   
"Noris Joffre está doblemente feliz por su integración al 'Show de Alexis Valdés'",   primerahora.com; accessed April 7, 2016. 
Noris Joffre se une al "'Show de Alexis Valdés' de Punto 2", primerahora.com; accessed April 7, 2016. 
"Noris Joffre está afincaíta a Univisión: La comediante se integrará oficialmente a 'Despierta América'}, primerahora.com; accessed April 7, 2016.  
"Noris Joffre se une al elenco de la telenovela Cosita linda", primerahora.com; accessed April 7, 2016. 
"Noris Joffre vuelve a ser 'ilegal': La actriz regresa a programa de comedia de Univisión Puerto Rico, elnuevodia.com; accessed April 7, 2016. 
"Con vida nueva Noris Joffre: La actriz contará sus experiencias en un libro", elnuevodia.com; accessed April 7, 2016. 
"Revela el feliz final del drama real de su vida: La actriz se reencontró con su madre biológica", elnuevodia.com; accessed April 7, 2016. 

1966 births
Living people
Puerto Rican people of Panamanian descent
Puerto Rican people of Irish descent
Puerto Rican comedians
Puerto Rican soap opera actresses
Puerto Rican television actresses
Actresses from Miami
21st-century American comedians
21st-century American actresses